Narciso Jesus Rodriguez III (born January 27, 1961) is an American fashion designer.

Early life and education
Rodriguez was born in Newark, New Jersey, the eldest child and only son of Cuban parents. His parents, Narciso Rodríguez Sanchez II, a longshoreman, and Rawedia María Rodríguez. His paternal grandfather was born on the Canary Islands.

He graduated from St. Cecilias High School in 1979, a small Catholic school in Kearny, New Jersey.

He studied at the New School in New York City,  at their art and design college, Parsons The New School for Design.  His parents were against Narciso entering fashion.

Career
Rodriguez performed freelance design work in New York before becoming Women’s Design Director for the Anne Klein label, then later working for Calvin Klein. His first major attention came in 1996 when he designed the wedding dress of fellow Calvin Klein employee Carolyn Bessette for her wedding to John F. Kennedy Jr. In 1997 he launched his own label.

When George magazine collapsed after John F. Kennedy Jr.'s death, Rodriguez hired Stephanie Mikesell, who had been an editorial assistant there, as his assistant.  He designed her wedding gown when she married Mark Madoff, eldest son of Bernie Madoff.

In 2003, he launched his first fragrance, Narciso Rodriguez for Her, inspired by a bottle of Egyptian musk oil he had been given in high school.

By 2006, Rodriguez, who had ended his partnership with his label's manufacturer, Aeffe, was over US$1 million in debt to his suppliers, and needed fabric donations for his spring collection.

On May 5, 2007, Liz Claiborne acquired a 50% interest in the Narciso Rodriguez label.  However, in 2008, Narciso Rodriguez bought the 50% interest back from Liz Claiborne for 12 million dollars. On November 4, 2008, Michelle Obama wore a dress from Narciso Rodriguez's spring 2009 collection when she joined her husband, Barack Obama, appearing for the first time as president-elect of the United States, on the stage at Grant Park in Chicago; it received substantial attention in the press. The dress, originally unveiled at New York City's Fashion Week in September 2008, came from Rodriguez's "stress-relief" design collection. Rodriguez was a strong supporter in the fashion world of Barack Obama's campaign; in August 2008, he blamed a slowdown in his business on "this Bush mess". Michelle Obama wore Narciso Rodriguez for her final State of the Union appearance as First Lady. The same year, Rodriguez' dresses were featured in a catwalk scene in the feature film The Women, as being the designs of the character Mary Haines (played by Meg Ryan).

References

External links
 NarcisoRodriguez.com
 
 

1961 births
Living people
People from Newark, New Jersey
High fashion brands
American fashion designers
Cuban people of Canarian descent
American people of Cuban descent
Parsons School of Design alumni